The Oregon Research Institute is an American psychology research institute in Eugene, Oregon. It manages the International Personality Item Pool.

References

External links
 Home page
 Winters, Jennifer. "Oregon Research Institute receives federal stimulus awards"

Psychology institutes
Organizations based in Eugene, Oregon
Research institutes established in 1960
Psychology organizations based in the United States
Mental health organizations in Oregon